Piedmont is an unincorporated community in Augusta County, Virginia, United States. During the American Civil War, the Battle of Piedmont between Union forces under Maj. Gen. David Hunter and Confederate forces under William E. Jones was fought on June 5, 1864 just north of Piedmont. During the battle, Jones was killed and Hunter's forces captured nearly 1,000 Confederate prisoners. The Confederate defeat near Piedmont allowed Hunter to easily occupy Staunton the next day, and threatened the Confederacy's security in the Shenandoah Valley as well as on other fronts, since it necessitated the need to detach Early's Second Corps from the main body of the Army of Northern Virginia near Petersburg, Virginia.

References

Unincorporated communities in Augusta County, Virginia
Unincorporated communities in Virginia